Caloptilia korbiella is a moth of the family Gracillariidae. It is known from the Russian Far East.

References

korbiella
Moths of Asia
Moths described in 1920